Wanamaker may refer to:

People 
 Brad Wanamaker (born 1989), American basketball player 
 Elizabeth Wanamaker (1911–1958), American civil rights activist
 John Wanamaker (1838–1922), American merchant, founder of Wanamaker's Department Store, considered by some to be the father of modern advertising
 Madeleine Wanamaker (born 1995), American rower
 Reuben Melville Wanamaker (1866-1924), American judge from Ohio Supreme
 Rick Wanamaker (born 1948), American athlete and basketball player
 Rodman Wanamaker (1863–1928), donor of the Wanamaker Trophy, son of John
 Sam Wanamaker (1919–1993), American actor and movie director, founder of Shakespeare's Globe Theatre in London 
 Zoë Wanamaker (born 1949), American-British actress; daughter of Sam

Places 
 Wanamaker, Indiana, a community of Indianapolis, US
 Wanamaker, Pennsylvania, a rural community in Lehigh County, US
 Wanamaker, South Dakota, a ghost town

Other 
 Wanamaker's, one of the first US department stores, founded in 1861
 The Wanamaker Organ, the world's largest operational pipe organ
 Wanamaker, Kempton & Southern, a railroad with a terminal at Wanamaker, Pennsylvania
 Wanamaker Mile, an annual mile-long race held in Madison Square Garden
 Wanamaker Trophy, the trophy awarded to the winner of the PGA Championship

See also